Haris Bashir (born 28 May 1993) is a Pakistani cricketer. He made his List A debut for Lahore Whites in the 2018–19 Quaid-e-Azam One Day Cup on 30 September 2018.

References

External links
 

1993 births
Living people
Pakistani cricketers
Lahore Whites cricketers
Place of birth missing (living people)